The men's pole vault event at the 1958 British Empire and Commonwealth Games was held on 25 and 26 July at the Cardiff Arms Park in Cardiff, Wales.

Medalists

Results

Qualification
Qualifying height: 13 ft (3.96 m)

Final

References

Athletics at the 1958 British Empire and Commonwealth Games
1958